Elsdon Douglas Oliver (9 September 1906 – 1992) was an English footballer who played as a full back for Rochdale. He also played non-league football for various other clubs.

References

Bedlington United A.F.C. players
Rochdale A.F.C. players
Guildford City F.C. players
Bangor City F.C. players
Coleraine F.C. players
Sportspeople from Ashington
Footballers from Northumberland
1906 births
1992 deaths
English footballers
Association football defenders